The Rwanda Women's First Division League is the top level women's association football league in Rwanda.

History 
Before the league 2004-2008...

League started in 2008 and is founded solely by money from FIFA. Introduction of play-offs after the season for the 2013–14 season. With just sixteen registered clubs, there is no relegation, but the creation of a second level league is planned. In 2015 FIFA sponsored the league with $70,000.

2013–14 teams
Teams are divided into two groups that play each other once. After that the top 4 teams from each group advance to the quarter-finals.

Pool A: AS Kigali, APR, Esir, Rambura, Urumuri, Freedom, Don Bosco Gatenga and Evening Stars.

Pool B: The Winners, Kamonyi, Inyemera, Bugesera, Les Lionnes, Imirasire, Atletico Huye and Academy Girls Sports Team.

2014-2015 teams

Teams: As Kigali, Youvia Football Academy, Rambura, Freedom de Gakenye, Kamonyi WFC, Bugesera, Inyemera, Les Lionnes, Atletico Huye, Academy Girls Sports Team, Golden Generation and Nyagatare WFC

Champions 
The list of champions and runners-up:

Top scorers
Shadia Uwamahirwe has been finishing top-scorer of the women’s football league from 2011 to 2013 scoring 24, 37 and 20 goals.

References

External links 
 Rwanda Football Federation website

Women's association football leagues in Africa
1
Women
Women's sports leagues in Rwanda